The Pangani black limbless skink or longtail limbless skink (Melanoseps longicauda) is an extant species of skink, a lizard in the family Scincidae. The species is found in Tanzania.

References

Melanoseps
Reptiles described in 1900
Reptiles of Tanzania
Endemic fauna of Tanzania
Taxa named by Gustav Tornier